Marib is a governorate of Yemen. It is located 173 kilometers to the northeast of Yemen's capital, Sana'a. The population of Marib Governorate comprises 1.2% of the country's total population. The city of Marib is the capital of the governorate, and was established after the discovery of oil deposits in 1984. The total number of residents living in the governorate was 238,522 according to the 2004 census, and the rate of growth was 2.72%.

As of 28 April 2020, it is the only governorate of the former North Yemen controlled by the internationally recognized Government of Yemen.

Geography

Climate
The governorate's climate varies based on elevation. The mountainous and elevated regions, which make up the western half of the governorate, are dominated by a moderate climate with hot summers and relatively cold winters. In the low-lying and plain regions, the climate is hot in the summers and moderate in the winters. The desert regions are characterized by a dry climate: hot in the summers, and cold and dry in the winters.

Summer rains fall on most parts of the governorate, but the amount of rainfall is usually small, especially in the eastern parts. Most parts of Ma'rib Governorate suffer from drought, given the sparse rainfall.

Adjacent governorates

 Al Jawf Governorate (north)
 Al Bayda Governorate (south)
 Shabwah Governorate (southeast)
 Hadhramaut Governorate (east)
 Sana'a Governorate (west).

Districts
Marib Governorate is divided into the following 14 districts, with Marib District the largest by area:

 Al Abdiyah District
 Al Jubah District
 Bidbadah District
 Harib District
 Harib Al Qaramish District
 Jabal Murad District
 Mahliyah District
 Majzar District
 Marib District
 Marib City District
 Medghal District
 Raghwan District
 Rahabah District
 Sirwah District

Agriculture and economy

In the 1980s, after the region was hit by floods, a dam was constructed in Marib, which would later be deemed to be important for the country's agriculture and economy. Its construction was financed by Sheikh Zayed bin Sultan Al Nahyan of the United Arab Emirates, who himself was reportedly a descendant of people from this area.

The area is home to the largest gas-fired power plant in Yemen, the Marib Gas Plant, whose electricity towers have been sabotaged continuously since the beginning of 2011. These sabotage operations did not stop until 2014, due to the inability of the Basindawa government to deter the saboteurs.

Agriculture is the main livelihood for the governorate's residents. Marib Governorate ranks third in Yemen behind Al Hudaydah Governorate and Sana'a Governorate in terms of agricultural production, making up 7.6% of the country's total agricultural production. Its most important agricultural products are fruits, grains, and vegetables. Many types of livestock are found in the governorate, including cattle, camels, sheep, goats, donkeys, and poultry. There are also quite a number of beehives. According to statistics for the time period 2007-11, the governorate was home to approximately 1,943,564 sheep, approximately 1,669,370 goats, roughly 42,000 cattle, and about 112,782 camels, which make up 3.80% of Yemen's total livestock.

Flora and fauna

Vegetation in the governorate is diverse, despite its sparseness and lack of density in terms of quantity and quality from place to place, depending on the nature of the surface and prevailing climate. The most important trees are the Christ's thorn jujube, qard tree, buckthorn, acacia (particularly or including the umbrella thorn acacia, as well as other thorny trees. There are also many types of grasses and small plants that grow in the rainy seasons.

Many types of wild animals are present in the governorate, and are plentiful in the western areas, including hyenas, snakes, wild rabbits, hedgehogs, and hyraxes. Birds include falcons, pigeons, eagles, and owls. The birds are numerous in areas dense with trees, as well as near wadis, especially those with water. The presence of the nimr (leopard) was reported in the Sarawat Mountains.

See also
Middle East
Sabaeans
South Arabia

References

 
Governorates of Yemen